Ruth Martin may refer to:

People
Claire Rayner (1931–2010), English writer who used the pseudonym Ruth Martin
Ruth Jefford (1914–2007), née Martin, American air taxi pilot

Fictional characters
Ruth Martin (All My Children), a character from the soap opera All My Children
Ruth Martin (Lassie), a character from the American television program Lassie
Ruth Martin (Neighbours), a character from the Australian television program Neighbours
Ruth Martin, a character in the novel and movie Silence of the Lambs and TV series Clarice.

See also

 
 Ruth (disambiguation)
 Martin (disambiguation)